QUAY-FM is a VHF-FM broadcasting station on the island of Alderney. It holds the only Community Radio licence in the Channel Islands which was granted in February 2014 to the Alderney Broadcasting Company (a non-profit organisation, limited by guarantee).

The scheme under which community radio stations were established in the United Kingdom by Ofcom originally did not apply to the Channel Islands, each of which has separate legal systems. Further legislation was needed in order to enable the establishment of community radio stations in the Islands.

After representations from the QUAY-FM volunteers who had been operating an twice-yearly RSL  and from the Government of Alderney, this was enabled by the extension, by Order-in-Council of the relevant parts of the UK's Communications Act, 2003 to the Bailiwick of Guernsey.

Applications were invited by Ofcom in December 2013 and closed in March the following year. This application round resulted in a licence being granted to the Alderney Broadcasting Company Limited, a non-profit company incorporated in Alderney, limited by guarantee (company number 1899) which was the only applicant within the Bailiwick, no applications having been received from either Guernsey or Sark.

History
The station was founded in the summer of 2000 by a number of volunteers, several of whom had backgrounds in BBC Radio, independent local radio (ILR) in the UK, and university radio. including Johnnie Fielder and Colin Mason.

The station was originally authorised to transmit on 87.7 MHz FM under a Restricted Service Licence (RSL) issued by the UK's Radio Authority. It broadcast only during the peak summer vacation period, including Alderney Week. In 2004, a regular Christmas broadcast period was added. The station equipment was kept available to be activated in times of civil emergency, which happened once during extreme weather conditions in the winter of 2010 (which was nicknamed "SNOW FM" locally, although the familiar QUAY-FM name was used on-air).

Since the start of 2015, QUAY-FM has broadcast year-round under a Community Radio Licence issued by Ofcom (successor licensing body to the Radio Authority).

Live, year-round transmissions were commenced at 7:00 a.m. on 12 February 2015 with the first transmission being made by Tim Butler (who was one of the original presenters on the very first RSL broadcasts in August 2000) presenting the Early Morning Show. (Tim Butler has been the Station Manager since 16th January 2023)

During the COVID-19 pandemic of 2020-2021, QUAY-FM became a vitally important part of the Island's contingency measures, with Willian Tate, the President of the States of Alderney, making daily broadcasts to update islanders on the situation during the emergency powers lockdown and in the following period during which restrictions were eased.

QUAY-FM started broadcasting on the Channel Island DAB+ local multiplex on 1 August 2021, and now can be received throughout Sark, Guernsey and Jersey in addition to the Alderney FM signal. The digital service was complemented by a local DAB+ transmitter for Alderney located at Fort Albert several months later. DAB services are provided by Nation Broadcasting

References

External links
 

Companies of Alderney
Radio stations in Guernsey
Community radio stations in the United Kingdom